Lisa Freeman (born July 28, 1957) is an American author and actress best known for her young adult surf fiction novel Honey Girl.

Life and career
Lisa Freeman was born in Los Angeles and grew up in coastal communities between Los Angeles and Hawaii, where her father Leonard Freeman created and produced the iconic TV series, Hawaii Five-O.

Freeman embarked in an acting career after graduating from Palisades High School. She was a student of Jeff Corey, Mary Carver, Joanne Baron, and a member of the Harvey Lembeck Comedic Workshop. Freeman performed at The Comedy Store in West Hollywood and appeared regularly on the Rick Dees in the Morning radio show.

Freeman's most notable film credits include Mr. Mom, Friday the 13th: The Final Chapter, Back to the Future and Back to the Future Part II. In 1980, she made her acting and TV debut on an episode of Knots Landing. Freeman landed her first TV role in the series In Trouble, co-starring with Nancy Cartwright and Deena Freeman (no relation).

Freeman was also part of the L.A. underground spoken word scene and was produced by Harvey Kubernick. Her albums include Hollyword, Neighborhood Rhythms, and her solo effort, Rough Road, all produced on New Alliance Records.

After more than a decade in front of the camera, Freeman left acting to pursue academia and a writing career. She began working with Kate Braverman in 1990 at the L.A. Writers Workshop, which soon led to academic studies at Antioch University, where she earned her BA and MFA in Fiction and Pedagogy in the Art of Writing.

Freeman currently serves on the National Leadership Council’s Board of Directors for the Native Arts and Cultures Foundation.

Filmography

Publications

Spoken Word CDs

Illustrations

References

External links

1957 births
Living people
American women writers
Antioch University alumni
American film actresses
American television actresses
21st-century American women